Ruth Moody is an Australian-born soprano singer-songwriter and member of the Canadian folk trio The Wailin' Jennys.

Biography
Moody grew up in Winnipeg, Manitoba, Canada, with her parents, Charles and Marcelline, and three siblings, older brother Richard (The Bills), older sister Jane and younger sister Rachel. She was trained classically from the age of four but unlike her two sisters and brother she did not take to a stringed instrument, and from her mid-teens began to train vocally instead. In 1993 she began to study English and French literature at university with the intent of becoming a teacher like both her parents. She changed her course in 1996 and decided to forge a life out of folk music instead.

Moody's first band was the Juno-nominated roots band Scruj MacDuhk, for whom she was lead singer from 1997 until the group's break up in 2001. After this split Ruth began to focus on her songwriting and picked up the guitar, adding it to her repertoire of piano, bodhran, accordion and banjo. It was also at this time that she started a musical collaboration with Nicky Mehta and Cara Luft. In 2002 the three took to the stage as The Wailin' Jennys. The Jennys (now Ruth Moody, Nicky Mehta and New York-based Heather Masse) have won international critical acclaim and numerous awards including Juno awards for their albums 40 Days and Bright Morning Stars. They have toured in North America, Europe and Australia.

Since 2002 Moody has released four full-length albums and an EP with The Wailin' Jennys, and an album with two ex-members of Scruj MacDuhk, Jeremy Penner and Oliver Swain, called South Bound. In July 2002 she released a solo EP called Blue Muse and in April 2010 she released her first full-length solo album, The Garden, produced by David Travers-Smith. The Garden was critically acclaimed and nominated for a Juno award, a Western Canadian Music Award, and three Canadian Folk Music Awards. In 2013 Moody released a new full-length solo album entitled These Wilder Things which included guitar and vocal support from Mark Knopfler among others. She also released a split 7-inch single with Old Man Luedecke in the spring of 2014, entitled "Far and Wide". The album was once again produced by David Travers-Smith.

In 2015, Moody recorded a duet with Mark Knopfler entitled "Wherever I Go", which subsequently appeared on his 2015 release, Tracker. She has toured as direct support for Mark Knopfler a number of times in Europe, and has appeared on stage with him for a handful of shows in the US.

Since the release of "These Wilder Things" in 2013 Ruth Moody has been touring non-stop throughout the world, as both a solo artist with her own band, or with The Wailin' Jennys.

Moody has received recognition for several of her compositions in the USA Songwriting Competition and the International Songwriting Competition. In April 2012 she won first prize in the International Songwriting Competition (Gospel Category) for her song "Storm Comin".

Discography

Scruj MacDuhk
 Live at the West End Cultural Centre (1997)
 The Road to Canso (1999)

Solo
 Blue Muse (2002) – Solo EP
 The Garden (2010) – Solo album
 These Wilder Things (2013) – Solo album

The Wailin' Jennys
 The Wailin' Jennys (2002)
 40 Days (2004)
 Firecracker (2006)
 Live at the Mauch Chunk Opera House (2009)
 Bright Morning Stars (2011)
 Fifteen (2017)

Other recordings
 South Bound (2003) – album by Moody Penner and Swain
 Putumayo – Women of the World Acoustic (2007) – with the Wailin' Jennys – compilation featuring Moody's "One Voice"
 Down at the Sea Hotel (2007) – with the Wailin' Jennys – compilation of lullabies featuring Red House Records artists
 Privateering (2012) – guest vocals with Mark Knopfler
 Far and Wide (2014) – split 7-inch with Old Man Luedecke
 Tracker (2015) – duet with Mark Knopfler on "Wherever I Go"; backing vocals on "Skydiver" and "Long Cool Girl"

References

External links

 Ruth Moody official website
 The Wailin' Jennys official website

Year of birth missing (living people)
Living people
21st-century Canadian violinists and fiddlers
Bodhrán players
Canadian folk violinists
Canadian women folk guitarists
Canadian women singer-songwriters
Canadian women violinists and fiddlers
Musicians from Winnipeg
The Wailin' Jennys members